In Our Own Time is a biography's film of the musical group, The Bee Gees. The story follows the Brothers Gibb, Barry, Robin and Maurice from their roots in Manchester, England through their emigration to Australia in 1958 to their international stardom in 1967, right up to the present, with new interviews done by Barry and Robin and archival footage of Maurice (who died in 2003). Many live performances are featured, along with video clips, TV performances and home movies from their early days.

Chapters
In Our Own Time
First Fame
Lonely Days
Beat Of A Different Drum
Fever
Andy
Spirits Having Flown
Songwriters
Brothers In Harmony
Recognition
The Music Must Go On

Releases
New interviews were filmed in high definition and archival footage is presented in 16:9 aspect ratio. In Our Own Time was released on DVD and Blu-ray.

2010 films
Bee Gees
Documentary films about pop music and musicians